William Edward Marsh (10 September 1917 - 6 February 1978) was a Welsh cricketer.  Marsh was a right-arm fast-medium bowler.  He was born at Newbridge, Monmouthshire.  He was educated at Monmouth School.

Marsh made his first-class debut for Glamorgan in 1947 against Middlesex.  He played 3 further first-class matches for the county in the 1935 season, with his final appearance coming against Worcestershire.  In his 4 first-class matches, Marsh took 8 wickets at a bowling average of 36.25, with best figures of 3/70.

Marsh died at Newbridge, Monmouthshire on 6 February 1978.

References

External links
William Marsh at Cricinfo
William Marsh at CricketArchive

1917 births
1978 deaths
People from Newbridge, Caerphilly
Sportspeople from Caerphilly County Borough
People educated at Monmouth School for Boys
Welsh cricketers
Glamorgan cricketers